Rudolf Ray (April 13, 1891 – May 1984) was a prolific expressionist painter who worked and exhibited in Austria, France, the United States, Mexico, India and Britain.

Born Rudolf Rapaport in Latvia, he later used the name Rudolf Ray. He trained in Vienna, where his work was praised by Oskar Kokoschka and the city's art critics. He arrived in New York City in 1942. From 1958 to 1960 he lived in Almora, India, and from 1960 to 1974 he lived in Mexico, died in London.

In 1927 he married Vienna-born painter Katharina Zirner, who died in childbirth in Kathmandu later that year. Their son, Martin, died aged 17 in Vienna in 1944. In the 1960s Rudolf lived in Tepotzlan, Mexico, with his wife Joyce.

Exhibitions 
1934 Galerie Neumann und Salzer, Wien
1936 Maski Gallery, Tel Aviv
1944 Peggy Guggenheim, The Art of This Century gallery, New York
1944 – 1955 Willard Gallery, New York
1955 Corcoran Gallery of Art, Washington
1956 Jehangir Gallery, Bombay
1959 All India Fine Arts and Crafts Society, New Delhi
1961 Antonio Souza Gallery, Mexico City
1962 Grand Central Moderns Gallery, New York
1966 Austrian Culture Institute, New York
1969 Palacio de Bellas Artes, Mexico City
1970 Retrospective, Vienna Secession, Wien
2019 Retrospective, Suppan Fine Arts, Wien

Public Collections 
Peggy Guggenheim Collection, Venedig
Metropolitan Museum of Art, New York
MUMOK Museum, Wien
Harvard Art Museums, Fogg Art Museum, Boston
Albertina Museum, Wien
Tel Aviv Museum, Tel Aviv
Belvedere Museum, Wien
Philadelphia Museum of Art, Philadelphia

References 
Martin Suppan: Rudolf Ray (1891-1984) - Maler zwischen Welten. Monograph. Galerie & Edition Suppan Fine Arts, Wien, 2019  
(Online)
Pollatschek, Stefan Der Maler Rudolf Rapaport : das Überwirkliche im Porträt ; eine Studie Wiener Buchund Kunstverlag, Wien, 1933
Greenberg, Clement 'The Crisis of the Easel Picture' in Art and Culture Critical Essays Beacon Press, 1961 
Ray, Rudolf Fragment einer Ausstellung Wiener Secession, Wien, 1970
O.K. Joshee, "Rudolf Ray - The American Painter who in discovering India discovered the "Self", NAV-YUG August 15, 1977 pg 4 (Hindi paper published in NY)

External links 
'Pictures of the Soul', Time Monday April 18, 1955
Austria's Forgotten Women Painters
'The Works of Ili Kronstein' Jewish Museum Vienna
''Ancestors and Family Connections for the ZWIEBACK Family Name'

1891 births
1984 deaths
20th-century Latvian painters